USS Eddy County (LST-759) was an  built for the United States Navy during World War II. Named after counties in New Mexico and North Dakota, she was the only U.S. naval vessel to bear the name.

LST-759 was laid down on 11 June 1944 at Ambridge, Pennsylvania by the American Bridge Company; launched on 29 July 1944; sponsored by Mrs. Norman Buckle Obbard; and commissioned on 25 August 1944.

Service history
During World War II, LST-759 was assigned to the Asiatic-Pacific theater and participated in the assault and occupation of Okinawa Gunto in April 1945. She was decommissioned on 29 March 1946.

On 1 July 1955 the ship was redesignated USS Eddy County (LST-759). The tank landing ship was berthed at the Columbia River Group of the Pacific Reserve Fleet until struck from the Naval Vessel Register on 1 October 1958. Her final fate is unknown.
 
LST-759 earned one battle star for World War II service.

References

See also
 List of United States Navy LSTs
 Eddy County, New Mexico
 Eddy County, North Dakota

LST-542-class tank landing ships
World War II amphibious warfare vessels of the United States
Ships built in Ambridge, Pennsylvania
Eddy County, New Mexico
Eddy County, North Dakota
1944 ships